Bosnia and Herzegovina relations with Kosovo are unofficial because Bosnia and Herzegovina's central government has not recognized Kosovo as an independence state, essentially through the veto of Bosnian Serb-dominated Republika Srpska.

On 21 February 2008, Republika Srpska, one of the two entities of Bosnia and Herzegovina, adopted a resolution through which it denounced and refused to recognise the unilateral declaration of independence of Kosovo from Serbia. In addition, the R.S. parliament adopted a resolution stating that in the event that a majority of EU and UN states recognise Kosovo's independence, Republika Srpska would cite the Kosovo secession as a precedent and move to hold a referendum on its own constitutional status within Bosnia and Herzegovina. Finally, the resolution called upon all Republika Srpska officials to do everything in order to prevent Bosnia and Herzegovina from recognising Kosovo's declared independence.

On 27 August 2008, former Bosnian ambassador in Turkey Hajrudin Somun wrote an editorial discussing Kosovan passports, where he summarised to-date the Bosnian position on Kosovo: "As in many other matters, Bosnia and Herzegovina is deeply divided over Kosovo's independence. The parliament of the Republika Srpska, which covers 49 percent of the country's territory, adopted a special resolution denouncing Kosovo's independence and wide demonstrations have been organized there in protest. Keeping in mind that Serb leaders of that entity have threatened to secede from Bosnia and Herzegovina and join Serbia as compensation for losing Kosovo, Bosnian collective presidency Chairman Haris Silajdžić said simply that his country is 'unlikely to recognize Kosovo's independence any time soon due to strong objections from its own Serb community.

The Foreign Minister Sven Alkalaj informed the public on 2 August 2008 that by law Bosnia and Herzegovina cannot accept Kosovan passports, until the Bosnian presidency makes such a determination.

On 26 September 2008 while attending General Assembly of the United Nations in New York, Bosnian Presidency Chairman Haris Silajdžić said in a Voice of America interview broadcast back to Bosnia in Bosnian language that he supports Kosovo's independence and is opposed to Serbia's request that the International Court of Justice issue an opinion on the legitimacy of Kosovo's independence. Silajdžić spoke in his own name because the Presidency of Bosnia and Herzegovina did not unanimously adopt a platform which would allow him to speak officially.

In August 2009 the Forum of Bosniaks (Bosnian Muslims) of Kosovo requested that Bosnia recognise Kosovo and the travel documents of its citizens. In response, Presidency ethnic Serb member Nebojša Radmanović stated that the Presidency would not discuss the issue in the foreseeable future, and that those making such demands must consider "what kind of state Bosnia-Herzegovina is, what tendencies are present, and what could be the consequences of such a move". He said, "Sometimes, thinking with the heart is not good for the bigger political goals".

Notes

See also
 Foreign relations of Bosnia and Herzegovina
 Foreign relations of Kosovo 
 Bosnia and Herzegovina–Serbia relations
 Accession of Bosnia and Herzegovina to the European Union 
 Accession of Kosovo to the European Union

References

 
Kosovo
Bilateral relations of Kosovo